Black & White is Flow's seventh studio album. The single has two editions: regular and limited. The limited edition includes a bonus DVD. It reached #29 on the Oricon charts  and charted for 3 weeks.

Track listing

Bonus DVD Track listing

References

Flow (band) albums
Ki/oon Records albums
2012 albums